Longsworth may refer to:

Charles Longsworth (b. 1929), an American company director
Lewis G. Longsworth (1904–81), an American chemist and biochemist
Lee-Longsworth House, a house in Bolivar, West Virginia